is a Czech politician and entrepreneur of Moravian Wallachian, Japanese and Korean ethnicity. He founded the Czech political parties Dawn of Direct Democracy and Freedom and Direct Democracy (SPD). Since October 2013, he has been a member of the Chamber of Deputies of the Czech Republic (MP), initially for Dawn of Direct Democracy and then from May 2015 for SPD (styled "SPD – Tomio Okamura"), of which he is also leader. He previously served as an independent Senator for Zlín district from October 2012 until his election to the Chamber of Deputies a year later. He has been placed as far-right.

Early life and background 
Okamura was born in Tokyo. His mother, Helena Okamura, born Holíková, a native of Moravian Wallachia, had moved there in 1966 following her marriage to Okamura's half-Japanese, half-Korean father, Matsu Okamura. Tomio Okamura lived in Japan for the first ten years of his life before his mother returned with her sons to Czechoslovakia. He spent a part of his childhood in a children's home in Mašťov in the Ústí nad Labem Region, where he was severely bullied, causing him to have a stutter until the age of 22. After leaving primary school he went on to study chemistry.

During his childhood he worked as a popcorn seller at a cinema in Japan.

Business career
He started his business career in 1994 mainly focused on the travel and gastronomy industries. He also started publishing a quarterly Pivní magazín ("Beer Magazine"). He is the author or co-author of several books. His book Tomio Okamura – Český sen ("Tomio Okamura – The Czech Dream") became a top 10 best-seller in the Czech Republic in 2010. In Spring 2011 his second book Umění vládnout ("The Art of Governance") was published. In 2012 he wrote a book Umění žít ("The Art of Living"). In 2013 he wrote two books – Umění přímé demokracie ("The Art of Direct Democracy") and Velká japonská kuchařka ("The Great Japanese Cookbook").

Okamura has links with a number of businesses including the Association of Czech Travel Agencies, where he was spokesman and vice-president. Other businesses Okamura has run include travel agent Miki travel and food shop Japa.

Okamura was a judge on Den D, the Czech version of British television programme Dragons' Den, for three series between 2009 and 2010.

Political career

Senate
In June 2012, Okamura, known previously as an advocate of direct democracy, announced his candidacy for the 2012 Czech Senate election as an independent candidate in Zlín. In the October election, Okamura led after the first round with 30% of the vote. Okamura won in a run-off against , taking 66% of the vote and winning a seat in the Senate on 20 October 2012.

In February 2013 Okamura was among a group of senators to sign a proposal to prosecute president Vaclav Klaus for high treason, regarding the amnesty announced by Klaus on finishing his term. The proposal was rejected by the Constitutional Court of the Czech Republic. Okamura also supported the constitutional amendment to abolish lifelong immunity for public officials. His Senatorial term expired on his election to the Chamber of Deputies, after he had served in the Senate for one year and six days.

2013 Presidential candidacy
Immediately following his election to the Senate, Okamura announced his intention to stand in the 2013 presidential election. Okamura's campaign submitted a list of 61,500 signatures. However, on 23 November 2012, the Ministry of Interior announced that only 35,750 signatures could be validated, and his candidacy was therefore refused. He appealed to the Supreme Administrative Court, which ruled that the Ministry of Interior had made an error while counting the signatures. Okamura appealed to the Ministry to re-calculate the signatures individually, rather than by estimation, but the appeal was denied.

In reaction to this verdict, Okamura announced that it was a "political decision", and questioned the independence of the judiciary. Rejecting the verdict of the Constitutional Court, Okamura denounced the verdict as unfair and claimed that it was not possible to obtain justice in the Czech Republic.

Dawn of Direct Democracy

In the 2013 parliamentary elections his party — Tomio Okamura's Dawn of Direct Democracy — obtained 342,339 votes (6.88%) and gained 14 seats. His previous senatorial mandate expired as a result of his election as a member of parliament.

Movement of Freedom and Direct Democracy 
In May 2015, Okamura founded a new political grouping in the Czech Chamber of Deputies, Freedom and Direct Democracy (SPD), a hard Eurosceptic, anti-immigration, and pro-direct democracy party. The SPD is allied to the French National Rally via the Movement for a Europe of Nations and Freedom European parliamentary alliance.

Okamura was reelected as a deputy in the 2017 legislative elections. The party came fourth, winning 22 seats.

Personal life
Okamura has two brothers; his older brother, is an interpreter and translator, and in 2015 joined KDU-ČSL, standing for that party in Prague in the subsequent legislative elections in 2017. He has been a member of the Chamber of Deputies since 2021. His younger brother, is an architect and university teacher. 

He has a son named Ruy from his three-year marriage to a Japanese woman. In January 2012, when he was 40 years old, it was reported that Okamura was dating a 20-year-old Czech student.

References

Further reading

External links

 Personal website

1972 births
Freedom and Direct Democracy presidential candidates
Living people
Members of the Senate of the Czech Republic
Japanese emigrants to Czechoslovakia
Czech eurosceptics
20th-century Czech businesspeople
21st-century Czech businesspeople
21st-century Czech politicians
Anti-Islam sentiment in Europe
Candidates in the 2013 Czech presidential election
Freedom and Direct Democracy MPs
Leaders of Freedom and Direct Democracy
Czech people of Japanese descent
Czech people of Korean descent
Politicians of Japanese descent
Members of the Chamber of Deputies of the Czech Republic (2013–2017)
Members of the Chamber of Deputies of the Czech Republic (2017–2021)
Members of the Chamber of Deputies of the Czech Republic (2021–2025)
Dawn – National Coalition politicians